Sathria simmialis is a moth in the family Crambidae. It is found in Jamaica, the Grenadines, Nevis, Saint Martin, Saint Kitts, Guadeloupe, Dominica and Grenada.

References

Moths described in 1859
Spilomelinae